Huntington Station may refer to:

Railroad stations

United Kingdom
Huntington railway station, Yorkshire, a former railway station near York

United States
Huntington station (Baltimore and Ohio Railroad), a former railway station in Huntington, West Virginia
Huntington station (LIRR), a LIRR station in Huntington, New York
Huntingdon station (SEPTA), a rapid transit station in Philadelphia, Pennsylvania
Huntington station (Washington Metro), a Metro station in Huntington, Virginia
Huntington station (West Virginia), an Amtrak station in Huntington, West Virginia

Places
Huntington Station, New York, a community in New York

See also
Huntingdon station (disambiguation)